Ernophthora maculicostella is a species of snout moth in the genus Ernophthora. It was described by Ragonot in 1888. It is found on the Marquesas Archipelago.

References

Moths described in 1888
Cabniini